Mike Morrell (born August 22, 1982) is an American college basketball coach, and current head coach of the UNC Asheville Bulldogs men's basketball team.

Playing career
Morrell was a two-sport athlete at Milligan College playing both basketball and golf. He was a three-year starter and 1,000-point scorer in men's basketball and two-time all-league selection in golf.

Morrell is still listed in the Milligan College men's basketball record books. As a freshman in 2000-01, he led the basketball team in free throw percentage (80.9%). During the 2002-03 season, he led the team in 3 pt field goals made (49) and free throw percentage (82.4%)

Coaching career
After graduation in 2005, Morrell landed his first coaching job at King University for two seasons before joining Oliver Purnell's staff at Clemson as a graduate assistant and director of basketball operations from 2007 to 2010. After a one-year stop at Charleston Southern, Morrell joined Shaka Smart's staff at VCU, and was part of four Rams NCAA Tournament squads. Morrell followed Smart to Texas as an assistant coach and stayed in the position until April 11, 2018 when he was named the seventh head coach in UNC Asheville men's basketball history, replacing Nick McDevitt who departed for Middle Tennessee.

Morrell has coached a number of National Basketball Association players, including 2014 NBA D-League All-star and current Phoenix Suns player Troy Daniels. He also coached 2015 A-10 Tournament MVP and current Charlotte Hornets player Treveon Graham, and three-time A-10 Defensive Player of the Year Brianté Weber, who plays with the Memphis Grizzlies. Most recently, Morrell coached current Atlanta Hawks player Isaiah Taylor, and 2016 McDonald's All-American Jarrett Allen, who was selected 22nd overall in the 2017 NBA Draft by the Brooklyn Nets.

Head coaching record

NCAA DI

References

1982 births
Living people
American men's basketball coaches
American men's basketball players
Basketball coaches from Tennessee
Basketball players from Tennessee
Charleston Southern Buccaneers men's basketball coaches
Clemson Tigers men's basketball coaches
Golfers from Tennessee
Milligan Buffaloes men's basketball players
People from Elizabethton, Tennessee
Texas Longhorns men's basketball coaches
UNC Asheville Bulldogs men's basketball coaches
VCU Rams men's basketball coaches